The 2009 China League Two season is the 20th season since its establishment. League kicked off on 9 May 2009 and ended on 28 November 2009 with the play-off final. Winners and runners-up promotes to China League One.

Division Standings
Updated on 26 Sep 2009.

South Division

North Division

Play-offs
Play-off finalists promotes to China League One.
According to the rule, the 2008–09 China University Football League winners and runners-up will qualify for the play-off first round. However, the winners China Three Gorges University had already qualified as Hubei CTGU Kangtian, and the 3rd place Tongji University withdrew. Therefore, the runners-up Hohai University and the 4th place Yanbian University qualified to play-offs.

First round

|}

Second round

|}

Semi-finals / Promotion finals

|}

Third place match

Champions final

Top scorers
Updated 28 Nov 2009

Notes and references

See also
2009 in Chinese football

External links
Official site 
News and results at Sohu 

3
China League Two seasons